Kot Jattan, is a village in U-C Dhandar Kashmir Pakistan, located within foothills of Himalayas, the village is situated in district and tehsil Bhimber. It has almost 500 houses with the population of a few thousands individuals.
The Nearest facilities and conveniences can be found in the nearby towns of Dhandar and Kadhala.

Location
Madni mosque is located in the middle of the village Kot jattan is on [Bhimber-Barnala Road] at a distance of about 12 km. from Bhimber, 15 km. from Barnala (Tehsil of Bhimber) and 8 km. from Kotla Arab Ali Khan .
Kot Jattan is surrounded by the following villages Nandwal located within Gujrat District to the South-West, Kot Chibban (its twin village) to the East and, Dhandar to the North-East.
Kot Jattan is situated at the southern edge of Azad Kashmir bordering Punjab Pakistan

Climate
climate data for Kot Jattan The climate here is mild, and generally warm and temperate. The summers are much rainier than the winters in Kot Jattan. This location is classified as Cwa by Köppen and Geiger. The average annual temperature in Kot Jattan is 23.7 °C. About 947 mm of precipitation falls annually. Precipitation is the lowest in November, with an average of 11 mm. The greatest amount of precipitation occurs in August, with an average of 268 mm. At an average temperature of 33.5 °C, June is the hottest month of the year. The lowest average temperatures in the year occur in January, when it is around 12.2 °C.

History
This area was near the site of an old citadel [castle] hence the name Kot.
The castle and adjoining town was destroyed in 960 AD by Maharaja of Kashmir due to the local governor ending his allegiance to the Maharaja in Sirinagar Kot and the town [old bhimber] was burned to the ground and the people killed, hence the human skeletons and burned property could be found on the adjoining hill called Pangloor. Kot and Pangloor is a national heritage site with history of at least two thousand years but is being destroyed by buildings and in general destruction.

Division
The village can be divided into these major areas:
 Chaprri Muhallah
 Charda Muhalla
 Lendha Muhallah
 Jandi ala Muhallah
 Varray ala Muhallah

Education
There are few schools to educate the children of the village., such as, a private school (KPS.) "Kashmir Public School" and Startwell Education AbdulSamad Campus - School, Kot Jattan and also the other " two government schools are serving to the children of this village. One of them is  being Primary School for Boys" and "the 2nd is being Govt Primary school for Girls"

Many students get their formal education from nearby town Dhandar and some other choose Bhimber to have quality education.

Library
The village also has a small religious library of Islamic Books.

Religion
All the people living in Kot Jattan are Muslims and they have Mosques namely "Madni Masjid, Gulzar-e-Habib Masjid, Sufi Rehmat Masjid and Tanvir Shaheed Masjid" to offer their prayers before God.
There is also a religious seminary (DMG) Darul Uloom Muhammadia Ghousia, also known as (Khushbu e Karam) that offers Islamic education including hifz and Dars-e-Nizami courses affiliated with Darul Uloom Muhammadia Ghousia of Bhera

Insaf welfare committee
People of the village have set up a committee to address the social problems and for the welfare of society.

Health
Currently, in 2021 there are no health-facilities or medical-care provided by the government of AJ&K to the people of this village directly, however, not very long ago, a UK based NGO Rahmat Nawab Trust UK started a project Rahmat Nawab Hospital (among other services,) that could prove to be a great help to the village. Rahmat Nawab Trust UK is a charitable organisation established in 2009. Rehmat Nawab Memorial Trust Hospital, Kot Jattan, was built by grandson of Ch Rehmat in his (grandfather’s) memory and graciously donated to Al Mustafa Trust. On 1 March 2020, it was converted into a fully functioning and operating AMT medical center. Kot Jattan, Bhimber, Azad Kashmir – Al Mustafa Trust.

See also
Bhimber District Nandwal Kot chibban

References

Populated places in Bhimber District